Labenopimplinae are an extinct subfamily of the parasitic wasp family Ichneumonidae.  
Labenopimplinae are known from the Cenomanian of the Russian Far East and Turonian of Orapa, Botswana. The subfamily includes five genera with 13 species. The subfamily is highly polymorphic and combines features of the Labeninae and Pimplinae.

List of genera
Armanopimpla
Labenopimpla
Micropimpla
Ramulimonstrum
Rugopimpla

References

Ichneumonidae
Fossil taxa described in 2010
Apocrita subfamilies